Saint Dometius (Domitius) the Persian (died 363) is venerated as a Christian martyr and saint.  According to tradition, he was martyred by lapidation during the reign of Julian the Apostate with two companions.  He was killed at Nisibis in Mesopotamia.

The name Domitius appears three times in the Roman Martyrology on different feast days (August 7, March 23, July 5); “it is uncertain that they were indeed the same person.”

Dometius of Persia was depicted in an 8th-century fresco in the church of Santa Maria Antiqua, in Rome.  This may indicate that there were Greek-speaking monks at Santa Maria Antiqua, as evidenced by these frescoes, which not only depicted Dometius but also Saints Barachisius, Euthymius, and Sabas of Palestine.

References

4th-century Christian martyrs
Persian saints
363 deaths
Year of birth unknown